LSU Tiger Trails is the alternative transportation system providing bus service for students, faculty, staff and visitors, both on and off the campus of Louisiana State University. The LSU transit system is operated by First Transit, under contract with LSU's Office of Parking & Transportation Services, formerly known as the Office of Parking, Traffic & Transportation.  There are a total of 31 buses in the Tiger Trails fleet. During daytime operating hours, the transit system is capable of operating up to 21 buses during peak hours with three back-up, and six small buses for on demand service.

History
From 1974 to 2009, Louisiana State University used Baton Rouge's Capital Area Transit System to transport its students, faculty and visitors on and off campus. The motion to create LSU Tiger Trails arose in 2008 due to poor bus service and unfulfilled requirements offered by Baton Rouge's Capital Area Transit System (CATS).  The Student Government of LSU, along with the Office of Parking & Transportation Services, received complaints filed against both the service and drivers of CATS. The LSU Student government requested that the university ask CATS to improve their service. After several requests by LSU asking for CATS to improve on their shortcomings, followed by no actions taken by CATS; the university began taking the initial steps of breaking away from the CATS contract and starting their own transit system.

Beginnings
In September 2008, the president and senior consultant of Solstice Transportation Consulting, Mitch Skyer came to meet with "Gary Graham, director of the Office of Parking, Traffic & Transportation [sic]," along "with administration, Student Government, transportation officials and passenger representatives" to initiate contact and being to evaluate the transit system. The Solstice Transportation Group held public forums, generated questionnaires, and researched the surrounding area of LSU for population of the LSU community. With the findings of the Solstice Transportation Group, they then mapped projections of routes which the buses should take to maximize usage and reduce route completion time. Solstice Transportation Group presented their projections to the committee in charge of deciding the matter, and the committee was in favor of the outcome of Solstice's projections. LSU put the projections of their new system up for bid to multiple transportation companies.  Out of the several companies who submitted their own proposals, First Transit won the bid because they were well priced and responsible.

Before Tiger Trails became 'Tiger Trails,' the LSU student body, facility and staff voted on an appropriate name. The top three most popular names were Tiger Trails, Easy Tiger, and Geaux Tiger, respectively. Tiger Trails took the majority of the vote with 47.3 percent, followed by Easy Tiger commanding 33.4 percent and Geaux Tiger with 19.3 percent.

Current fleet
There are two types of buses in the fleet. The majority of the fleet consists of the 'Eldorado' buses costing around $300,000. There are ten 30 ft and fifteen 40 ft Eldorados. These are the  bigger of the two with flat fronts, and are used for the fixed routes.

The other type is the 'Glavel' buses which is built on a Ford truck or van chassis with a passenger cab, and cost around $150,000. There are two E550 vans and four F550 buses. These are used for on demand services running from 5:30pm-midnight 7 days a week.

References

Tiger Trails
University and college bus systems
Transportation in Baton Rouge, Louisiana